The Second Battle of Novi or Battle of Bosco (24 October 1799) saw a Republican French corps under General of Division Laurent Gouvion Saint-Cyr face a division of Habsburg Austrian soldiers led by Feldmarschall-Leutnant Andreas Karaczay. For several hours the Austrians defended themselves stoutly, relying on their superior cavalry and artillery. By the end of the day the French and allied Poles routed the Austrians from their positions in this War of the Second Coalition action. Novi Ligure is south of Alessandria, Italy.

A string of defeats, culminating with the Battle of Novi on 15 August 1799 left the French Army of Italy clinging to Genoa, Cuneo and the crests of the Ligurian Alps. An Austrian threat to Genoa was met with Saint-Cyr's strong thrust north through Novi against Karaczay's division at Bosco Marengo. Farther west, Jean Étienne Championnet with the main body of the Army of Italy clashed with Michael von Melas's Austrians at Genola on 4 November.

References

Conflicts in 1799
Battles of the French Revolutionary Wars
Battles of the War of the Second Coalition
Battles involving France
Battles involving Austria
Battles involving Poland
1799 in Italy